The Forty-Niners is a 1954 American Western film directed by Thomas Carr and written by Daniel B. Ullman. The film stars Wild Bill Elliott, Virginia Grey, Harry Morgan, John Doucette, Lane Bradford and I. Stanford Jolley. The film was released on May 4, 1954, by Allied Artists Pictures.

Plot
Behind a narration in the style of Jack Webb on TV's "Dragnet", U.S. Marshal Sam Nelson, posing as Sam Smith, is sent to a gold-boom town in California to learn the identity of three killers. Posing as a gunman and killer, he soon strikes up a friendship with card-sharp Alf Billings after saving him from being lynched when caught cheating in a card game. Billings suggests they become partners as his skill with cards (overlooking the near lynching he just escaped) and Sam's ability with guns should make them a fortune. Sam agrees, hoping that Billings will lead him to the men he is hunting. Billings leads him to Coldwater sheriff William Norris and Ernie Walker, Norris's partner in a saloon and gambling operation, both implicated in the murder case Sam is investigating.

Cast          
Wild Bill Elliott as Sam Nelson 
Virginia Grey as Stella Walker
Harry Morgan as Alf Billings
John Doucette as Ernie Walker
Lane Bradford as William Norris
I. Stanford Jolley as Everett
Harry Lauter as Gambler
Earle Hodgins as Hotel Clerk
Dean Cromer as Sloane
Ralph Sanford as Bartender

References

External links
 

1954 films
American Western (genre) films
1954 Western (genre) films
Allied Artists films
Films directed by Thomas Carr
Films scored by Raoul Kraushaar
American black-and-white films
1950s English-language films
1950s American films